Bukit Tagar Landfill is a landfill in Bukit Tagar, Selangor.

References

Further reading 
 
 
 
 
 
 

Landfills
Hulu Selangor District
Buildings and structures in Selangor
Environment of Malaysia